Pracht is surname of:
 Charles Frederick Pracht (1880 – 1950), a Republican member of the U.S. House of Representatives
 Eva Maria Pracht (1937–2021), a German-Canadian Olympic equestrian
 Martina Pracht (b. 1964), a German-Canadian equestrian
 Karl Robert Pracht (1878–1961), a German composer and music educator

See also 
 Pracht, a municipality in the district of Altenkirchen, Rhineland-Palatinate, western Germany

German-language surnames